The Uganda national rugby sevens team team won the 2022 Africa Mens 7s, which were World Cup and Commonwealth Games qualifiers.

Uganda won the Africa Mens 7s on 23rd April 2022 at Kyadondo Rugby Ground. This tournament was played by 14 countries.They made their first world cup appearance after winning the 2017 Africa Cup Sevens,

Players

Current squad

Tournament History

Rugby World Cup Sevens

Commonwealth Games

Africa Sevens
 This was an olympic qualifier in Johannesburg.

Uganda has won the Africa Seven three times. Years: 2016,2017,2022.

See also
 Uganda national rugby union team (XV)
 Rugby union in Uganda

References

National rugby sevens teams
sevens